Ardalan Football Academy is an Iranian women's football academy that was established by Niloofar Ardalan in 2014 in Tehran.

This academy was the first specialized women's football academy in Iran, which initially started its work as "Ardalan Stars" football school, but gradually, with Niloofar Ardalan new action in the field of women, his decision went beyond a football school. And Ardalan decided to establish the first women's football academy called "FC Ardalan".

Since the establishment of Ardalan Women's Football Academy, many players have been introduced to the Iranian women's national football team through the academy, including Nazanin Mansour Alvares and Diana Norouzi as two prominent figures introduced by the academy.

Ardalan Women's Football Academy also has a history of playing preparatory games with the Iran women's national football team.

Current staff

Training place 
Ardalan Football Academy holds trainings in two different parts of Tehran; ‌ Some training sessions are held in Samen Cultural and Sports Complex in Shahrake Gharb and other sessions are held in Shateri Cultural and Sports Complex in Bagh Azari neighborhood.

References

External links 

 Official website

Association football clubs established in 2014
2014 establishments in Iran
Football clubs in Iran
Football academies in Iran